Linyi is a prefecture-level city of Shandong.
 Lanshan District, Linyi, formerly Linyi County and county-level city, now the urban center of Linyi

Linyi may also refer to:

 Linyi County, Dezhou, Shandong
Linyi Town, Dezhou, town in and seat of Linyi County
 Linyi County, Shanxi
 Lâm Ấp or Linyi, an ancient kingdom in present-day central Vietnam.

See also 
 Lin Yi